Bielefeld Hauptbahnhof is the main station in the region of Ostwestfalen-Lippe, in the German state of North Rhine-Westphalia. It is an important station because of the size of the city of Bielefeld and its location at the Bielefeld Pass, which makes it a node for long-distance and regional traffic. It was opened in 1847 with the opening of the Cologne-Minden trunk line. It is classified by Deutsche Bahn as a category 2 station.

Station environment 

Bielefeld Hauptbahnhof is located in the north-west of Bielefeld between the Neue Bahnhofsviertel (new station district) and the city centre. Not far from the station building is the entrance to the underground station on the Stadtbahn line running through the inner city. Opposite is the Stadthalle Bielefeld conference centre, which includes a hotel.

It is a through station on the Hamm–Minden railway, which runs through the city from the north-east to the south-west. Since it has no train shed, the platforms have individual canopies.

History 

At the opening of the Hamm–Minden railway section of the Cologne-Minden Railway Company’s trunk line on 15 October 1847, Bielefeld station had only a temporary wooden building. The first stone station building was completed in 1849. It was rebuilt and enlarged in 1885. The station at the time was far to the north of the city, because enough flat land was available there. Southwest of the station, the line passes close to the old town, but is already rising to cross the Bielefeld Pass. The almost one km between the old town and the station stimulated the development of public transport in Bielefeld. In the coming decades, the residential and industrial development of the city extended to the station and eventually beyond.

In the first decades not all express train stopped in Bielefeld. Minden as a seat of the provincial government and a fortress with a large garrison was more important to the government of Prussia than the industrial town of Bielefeld.

The number of passengers rose sharply, so that a new station building was required in Bielefeld. The construction of today's entrance building began in 1907. The Art Nouveau building with natural stone facades was opened on 1 May 1910. In the west wing there was a waiting room for first and second class passengers and a waiting room for third and fourth class passengers, in the east wing rail offices and apartments for rail staff. In the entrance hall there were a ticket office and a baggage counter. The entrance building originally had an adjoining platform. During the reconstruction of the Hamm–Minden line to four tracks between 1911 and 1917, six platform tracks were built on three platforms connected to the station building by passenger and baggage tunnels. Until the beginning of the 21st century the platforms were hardly changed. This means that track 1 runs directly alongside the station building and all the platforms are only accessible through the tunnel. A freight terminal building, which was stylistically matched to the entrance building, but without its natural stone facades, was built on the north side of the station's tracks.

The heavy air raids on Bielefeld in September 1944 left the station almost undamaged so that the façade is virtually unchanged despite several modernisations of the building. There is a memorial on the station forecourt in remembrance of the deportation of Jews to the extermination camps from Bielefeld station during the Nazi dictatorship.

In 1946 and 1947 Bielefeld station was the headquarters of the railways of the American and British occupation zone (Hauptverwaltung der Eisenbahnen des amerikanischen und britischen Besatzungsgebiets), from which Deutsche Bundesbahn emerged in 1949. The last act of the Deutsche Bundesbahn, Generalbetriebsleitung (general management) West, Bielefeld was to publish the official winter timetable for the period from 2 October 1949 to 13 May 1950.
	
The importance of the station in the railway network was consolidated with the electrification of the Hamm–Hanover main line on 29 September 1968 and the introduction of the Intercity-Express connection between Cologne and Berlin in the 1990s, stopping in Bielefeld, with connections at regular-intervals with regional services.

Recent reconstruction 

During the rebuilding of the central sections of the Bielefeld tramway underground, the underground Stadtbahn station was not built under the Hauptbahnhof for cost reasons. The Hauptbahnhof Stadtbahn station was instead built 150 m to the south-east and is connected to the station forecourt by a covered travelator (popularly known as die Tüte: "the bag"). At the beginning of the 21st century the old freight yard to the north of the line was demolished to make room for an entrance and exit of the Ostwestfalendamm expressway and the Neue Bahnhofsviertel (new station district).

The construction included the widening and extension of the pedestrian tunnel to the north and the provision of barrier-free access to existing platforms and to the heritage-listed station building. Additional tracks and a new platform were built on the north side of the station. The station was expanded to seven platform tracks next to four platforms.
	
The expansion and modernisation of the station were intended to be completed in 2000. But after the bankruptcy of the general contractor, construction work was suspended due to unresolved financial issues for a period of 17 months. Since the reconstruction took place under traffic, this resulted in significant disruptions for passengers. Construction was finally completed in September 2006. These works cost a total of €26.2 million.

The station is now directly connected to the new station district on the north side, increasing the attractiveness of the city. The dining establishments, nightclubs, spa and leisure facilities benefit from the direct access to the station. The station district and the railway station also support each other, as for example the car park of the new district is also used by rail passengers.

Rail services 

Long-distance and regional services run from Bielefeld Hauptbahnhof on the Ruhr–Hanover line and regional services run within the Ostwestfalen-Lippe region. Because the station has only 7 platform tracks, individual platforms are sometimes occupied by two trains at the same time.

Long-distance

Regional services 

All regional trains, trams and buses can be used with Der Sechser (“the six”) fares of the Zweckverband Verkehrsverbund OWL (Ostwestfalen-Lippe transport association) and NRW-tariff fares. An exception to this rule are the night buses running between 1 AM and 5 AM. The Niedersachsen-Ticket can be used on the Regional-Express service RE 70 (Weser-Leine-Express) by buying a supplement from/to Herford.

Stadtbahn connections 

The underground Stadtbahn station is served by all Stadtbahn lines:

Buses run from the station forecourt to, among other places, Bad Salzuflen, Leopoldshöhe, Borgholzhausen, Gütersloh and Steinhagen. These also serve urban destinations, such as Heepen, Dornsberg and Quelle (Bielefeld). Nevertheless, the central bus transfer point in Bielefeld is located at Jahnplatz (a stadbahn stop away), where buses run in all directions.

Parking and cycle facilities 

There is a parking area In  the new station district on the north-west side of the station. There is cycle parking right next to the station building. Alternatively, it is possible to hire bikes and electric bikes.

Access 

The main entrance is located in the station forecourt (Bahnhofsplatz), just 200 metres walk from the entrance to the Stadtbahn station. It is accessible by barrier-free lifts and moving walkways. Furthermore, the station is accessible from the new station district, which lies on the opposite side of the station.

Platform tracks 1 to 6 are accessible by wheelchair using lifts and the underpass. Track 8 can be reached from ground level from the new station district, which can be reached by lift and underpass from the station building.

Notes

References

External links 

 

Railway stations in North Rhine-Westphalia
Hauptbahnhof
Art Nouveau architecture in Germany
Railway stations in Germany opened in 1847
Buildings and structures completed in 1910
Art Nouveau railway stations
1847 establishments in Prussia